GenCon IX Dungeon is an adventure for fantasy role-playing games published by Judges Guild in 1978.

Contents
GenCon IX Dungeon is a classic early tournament dungeon.  In a Celtic mythos world, the player characters must penetrate Baldemar Castle and win the Staff of Albalon.

Publication history
GenCon IX Dungeon was written by Bob Blake, and was published by Judges Guild in 1978 as a 32-page book.

Reception

References

Judges Guild fantasy role-playing game adventures
Role-playing game supplements introduced in 1978